The Barracks is a 1999 Russian drama film directed by Valeriy Ogorodnikov.

Plot 
People of different nationalities and character settled in one hut. And suddenly the blockade Olga comes to them...

Cast 
 Irina Senotova
 Yuliya Svezhakova
 Evgeniy Sidikhin as Bolotin
 Nina Usatova
 Sergey Kachanov
 Natalya Egorova		
 Leonid Yarmolnik	
 Artyom Gusev
 Dmitri Bulba
 Aleksey Devotchenko

References

External links 
 

1999 films
1990s Russian-language films
Russian drama films
1999 drama films
German drama films
1990s German films